The Spivak pronouns are a set of gender-neutral pronouns in English promulgated on the virtual community LambdaMOO based on pronouns used in a book by American mathematician Michael Spivak.  Though not in widespread use, they have been employed in writing for gender-neutral language by those who wish to avoid the standard terms "he/she" or singular they.

Three variants of the Spivak pronouns are in use, Rogers (1890), Elverson (1975), and LambdaMOO (1991), highlighted in the declension table below.

{| class="wikitable center" style="vertical-align:top;"
|+ Declension table for Spivak pronoun variants
|-
! Variant
! Subject || Object || Possessive adjective || Possessive pronoun || Reflexive
|-
! scope="row" | Masculine
| he laughs || I hugged him || his heart warmed || that is his || he loves himself
|-
! scope="row" | Feminine'| she laughs || I hugged her || her heart warmed || that is hers || she loves herself|-
! scope="row" | Singular they
| they laugh || I hugged them || their heart warmed || that is theirs || they love themself|- style="background:#ffdead"
! scope="row" | Rogers (1890)
| e laughs || I hugged em || es heart warmed
|-
! scope="row" | Lindsay (1920)
| ae laughs || I hugged aer || aer heart warmed || that is *aers || ae loves *aerself|- style="background:#ffdead"
! scope="row" | Elverson (1975)
| ey laughs || I hugged em || eir heart warmed || that is eirs || ey loves emself|-
! scope="row" | "anti-Carlton" (1977)
| ee laughs ||   || *ees heart warmed || that is *ees || ee loves eeself 
|-
! scope="row" | Tintajl (1977)
| em laughs || I hugged em || ems heart warmed || that is ems || em loves emself|-
! scope="row" | MacKay (1980)
| E laughs || I hugged E || Es heart warmed
|-
! scope="row" | Spivak (1983)
| E laughs || I hugged Em || Eir heart warmed
|- style="background:#ffdead"
! scope="row" | LambdaMOO "spivak" (1991)From 1998 through 2011, LambdaMOO's "help spivak" output described the spivak set as "E – subject", "Em – objective", "Eir – possessive (adjective)", "Eirs – possessive (noun)" and "Emself – reflexive".
| e laughs || I hugged em || eir heart warmed || that is eirs || e loves emself|}

The original ey has been argued to be preferable to e, because the latter would be pronounced the same as he in those contexts where he, him, his loses its h sound.

 History 
The precise history of the Spivak pronouns is unclear, since they appear to have been independently created multiple times, each time likely without knowledge of the previous.

The first recorded use of the pronouns was in a January 1890 editorial by James Rogers, who derives e, es, and em from he and them in response to the proposed "thon". Coincidentally, Scottish author David Lindsay used similar forms ae and aer in his novel A Voyage to Arcturus, referring, however, to  non-terrestrial sapients "unmistakably of a third positive sex".

In 1975, Christine M. Elverson of Skokie, Illinois, won a contest by the Chicago Association of Business Communicators to find replacements for "she and he", "him and her", and "his and hers". Her "transgender pronouns" ey, em, and eir were formed by dropping the "th" from they, them, and their. (See 'em.) The article that first reported the pronouns treated them as something of a joke, concluding with the line, "A contestant from California entered the word 'uh' because 'if it isn't a he or a she, it's uh, something else.' So much of eir humor."

Writing in 1977, poet, playwright, and linguist Lillian Carlton submitted a letter to the journal American Speech reporting (and arguing against) the invention by "an American professor" (likely Dr. Donald MacKay) of pronouns based on "the long sound of the vowel e i". Although her primary argument against the proposed word is her assertion that English "already [has] a perfectly good... word that refers to either sex", namely "one", she also raises the observations that "spoken fast, it comes uncomfortably close to the illiterate hisself... [Furthermore], ee sounds too much like he and would therefore be confusing." Similar arguments, along with the desire to distance themselves from the male-centric singular "he" and derivatives, are still a primary factor in the proliferation of constructed pronouns.

Also in 1977, Jeffery J. Smith, Emeritus Professor of Philosophy and Humanities at Stanford University, writing under the pen name "Tintajl jefry", proposed "Em" as "a personal noun-pronoun which in itself gives no indication of sex, age, or number, though these may be shown by its context." He proposes a vast number of possible uses for "em", including but not limited to the replacement of "the formal Dear, because em is a thou word, a term of respect for all people, bar none... Dear Em Doe is redundant. Em Doe is enough, and, since it is brief; it makes room for given names: Em John Doe, Em Mary and John Doe, or, better, Em Doe John, Em Doe John and Mary."

The May 1980 issue of American Psychologist reported on another study by MacKay, testing rates at which subjects miscomprehended the gender of a subject in textbook paragraphs when written with he meaning he or she compared with three epicene pronoun sets: E, E, Es, Eself; e, e, es, eself; and tey, tem, ter, temself.

In 1983, a mathematician-educator, Michael Spivak, wrote an AMS-TeX manual, The Joy of TEX: A Gourmet Guide to Typesetting with the AMS-TEX Macro Package  (1986), using E, Em, and Eir. His set was similar to Elverson's, but capitalized like one of MacKay's sets.

In May 1991, a MOO programmer, Roger Crew, added "spivak" as a gender setting for players on LambdaMOO, causing the game to refer to such players with the pronouns e, em, eir, eirs, emself. The setting was added along with several other "fake genders" in order to test changes to the software's pronoun code, and was left in place as a novelty. To Crew's surprise, the Spivak setting caught on among the game's players, while the other gender settings were mostly ignored.Moomail from Rog to Lig, 2001-08-26, quoted in 

Other writers applied Elverson's original "th"-dropping rule and revived "ey", such as Eric Klein in his legal code for a planned micronation called Oceania. John Williams's Gender-neutral Pronoun FAQ (2004) promoted the original Elverson set (via Klein) as preferable to other major contenders popular on Usenet (singular they, sie/hir/hir/hirs/hirself, and zie/zir/zir/zirs/zirself).

Usage
Spivak is one of the allowable genders on many MUDs (multi-user dungeon) and MOOs (MUD object-oriented). Others might include some selection of: masculine, feminine, neuter, either, both, "splat", plural, egotistical, royal, and 2nd. The selected gender determines how the game engine refers to a player.

On LambdaMOO, they became standard practice for help texts ("The user may choose any description e likes"), referring to people of unknown gender ("Who was that guest yesterday, eir typing was terrible"), referring to people whose gender was known but without disclosing it ("Yes I've met Squiggle. E was nice."), or of course characters declaring themselves to be of gender Spivak. In recent years (2000 onwards), this usage has been declining.

Nomic games, especially on the Internet, often use Spivak pronouns in their rulesets, as a way to refer to indefinite players.

The visual novel series Magical Diary'' uses Spivak pronouns in spell descriptions to refer to the caster, and explains them in an event as a part of magical culture necessitated by interaction with nonhuman species.

Spivak pronouns and gender in virtual communities

In online anonymous situations, Spivak and other gender neutral pronouns can be motivated by avoiding gendered speech that would make divisions in the social group more likely and the group possibly less productive or enjoyable. This contact with genderless pronouns in virtual communities is sometimes a person's first experience and experimentation with presenting their gender in a genderqueer or transgender  manner.

Publications employing Spivak pronouns

Elverson 1975 set (ey, em, eir)

"Spivak" 1991 set (e, em, eir)
 
 
 
 
 
 
 the Orion's Arm universe

See also
 Generic antecedents
 Ri (pronoun), Esperanto
 Elle (Spanish pronoun)
 Hen (pronoun), Swedish
 Iel (pronoun), French
 Elu (Portuguese pronoun)
 Gender-neutral pronouns
 Neopronoun

Notes

References

External links 

 Gender-neutral pronoun FAQ on Aetherlumina.com

English pronouns